Memed, My Hawk is a 1955 novel by Yaşar Kemal. It was Kemal's debut novel and is the first novel in his İnce Memed tetralogy. The novel won the Varlık Prize for that year (Turkey's highest literary prize), and earned Kemal a national reputation. In 1961, the book was translated into English by Edouard Roditi, thus gaining Kemal his first exposure to English-speaking readers.

Plot
Memed, a young boy from a village in Anatolia, is abused and beaten by the villainous local landowner, Abdi Ağa. Having endured great cruelty towards himself and his mother, Döne, Memed finally escapes with his beloved, a girl named Hatçe. Abdi Ağa catches up with the young couple, but only manages to capture Hatçe, while Memed is able to avoid his pursuers and runs into the mountains. There he joins a band of brigands and exacts revenge against his old adversary. Hatçe is then imprisoned and eventually dies while Memed tries to protect themselves on a mountain, but not before giving birth to Memed's son, who is also named Memed. When Memed returns to the town, a villager named Hürü Ana tells him he has a "woman's heart" if he surrenders himself. Instead of surrendering and being granted amnesty by the government, he rides into town to find his enemy, on a horse given to him by the townspeople. He finds Abdi Ağa in the south-east corner of his house and shoots him in the chest. The local authorities hear the gunshots, but Memed gets away. He returns to the mountains and gives his son in protection of Iraz, Hatçe's friend from the jailhouse.

Film adaptation

In 1984, the novel was freely adapted by Peter Ustinov into a film, produced by Fuad Kavur.

References

External links
 
 Compiled newspaper reviews from Amazon.com

1955 novels
Novels by Yaşar Kemal
Novels set in Turkey
Turkish novels adapted into films
1955 debut novels